Roberto Morandotti is a physicist and full Professor, working in the Energy Materials Telecommunications Department of the Institut National de la Recherche Scientifique (INRS-EMT, Montreal, Canada). The work of his team includes the areas of integrated and quantum photonics, nonlinear and singular optics, as well as terahertz photonics.

Educational background 
1993: M.Sc. Physics, University of Genoa1999: Ph.D. Electrical Engineering, University of Glasgow

Professional background 
1999-2001: Postdoctoral Researcher, Weizmann Institute of Science2001-2002: Postdoctoral Researcher, University of Toronto2003-2008: Associate Professor, INRS-EMT, Université du Québec2008 - : Full Professor, INRS-EMT, Université du Québec

Professional recognition, honors and awards 
 Excellence Prize for Scholar Merit, Rotary Association
 PhD fellowship, Bilateral UK – Israeli Fund
 Postdoctoral Fellowship, Engineering and Physical Sciences Research Council (EPRSC) (UK)
 Postdoctoral Fellowship, Weizmann Institute of Science
 Marie Curie European Community Fellowship
 Postdoctoral Fellowship, University of Toronto
 FQRNT (Fonds québécois de la recherche sur la nature et les technologies) Strategic Professor
 Fellow, Institute of Nanotechnology (IoN)
 Full Member (Fellow), Sigma Xi, the Scientific Research Society
 Fellow of the OSA (Optical Society), for "seminal contributions to the field of nonlinear optics, in particular for the discovery of discrete optical solitons" 
 Fellow of the SPIE, for "achievements in nonlinear optics and magneto-optics"
 Fellow of the Royal Society of Canada
 Fellow of the Institute of Physics
 Fellow of the American Physical Society for "pioneering contributions in discrete optics, nonlinear dynamics, and nonlinear optics in the THz domain"
Fellow of the American Association for the Advancement of Science for "distinguished contributions to the field of nonlinear and quantum optics"
Fellow of the Institute for Electrical and Electronic Engineering for "contributions to integrated nonlinear and quantum optics" 
 NSERC E.W.R. Steacie Memorial Fellow
 NSERC Synergy Award Recipient
 NSERC Brockhouse Award Recipient
 Marie-Victorin Award Recipient

Most important scientific contributions 
 Experimental demonstration of discrete solitons and their dynamical properties.
 Demonstration of Anderson Localisations and band gap structures in waveguide arrays.
 Kerr spatio-temporal solitons in a planar glass waveguide (light bullets) and liquid crystals, X waves in bi-dispersive media, self-accelerating non-diffractive beams
 Ultrafast, extremely low power nonlinear optics in glass and semiconductor integrated waveguides
 Various contributions in the fields of linear and nonlinear optics in the THz Regime: A state of the art high power THz source to probe the nonlinear interaction of intense few-cycle terahertz pulses, demonstration of nonlinear wavelength conversion using THz waves, of new THz characterization techniques, including the first THz Optical Isolator.
Demonstration of multiphoton, multidimensional and cluster complex quantum states using optical micro combs

References

External links 
Energy Materials Telecommunications Department of the Institut National de la Recherche Scientifique

Videos
 CLEO: 2014 - What's New with QELS- Fundamental Science 2014? 
 Nonlinear Optics and Novel Phenomena Hot Topic - CLEO: 2012 
 Hot Topic CLEO:QELS - Fundamental Science 5 - Nonlinear Optics and Novel Phenomena

1967 births
Living people
21st-century Italian physicists
Academic staff of the Université du Québec
University of Genoa alumni
Alumni of the University of Glasgow
Fellows of the Royal Society of Canada
21st-century Canadian physicists
Fellows of the American Physical Society